Gar-Field Senior High School is a senior high school in Woodbridge in unincorporated Prince William County, Virginia, USA, with students in grades 9 through 12. Established in 1953, it was originally located at 15941 Cardinal Drive until the current school opened in 1972 on 14000 Smoketown Road.

It has recently been one of the largest high schools in Virginia, with enrollment peaking at over 3,000.

History
The high school's motto is "The School of Champions" and they have been rivals with Woodbridge High School for many years.

The name Gar-Field is derived from two prominent local families, the Garbers and the Manderfields, who donated the land for the original school just off of U.S. Highway #1. The comic strip Ber-Mander, which appears on the back page of the school newspaper, utilizes the unused portions of these names. Ber-Mander was created by artist Chris Sprouse (a 1984 graduate of Gar-Field) in the early 1980s, and featured a "hippie" title character.

In the 1950s, Gar-Field was segregated, as were Virginia's other schools.  However, in 1962, African-American students were enrolled without incident.

Gar-Field is one of two high schools in Prince William County that offer the International Baccalaureate (IB) Diploma Program and the IB Middle Years Program. It also has the only accredited daycare system of any high school in the state, with a program that allows student-parents to finish their education while learning about how to take care of their children.

Gar-Field is of similar design to that of nearby Woodbridge High School, which was also built in the mid-1970s.

In May 2007, Newsweek Magazine ranked Gar-Field 564th in the nation on its annual list of "Best High Schools in America."

The principal is Matthew Mathison. Before coming to Gar-Field, he was an assistant principal at Woodbridge Senior High School. He has been principal since 2019.

Graduation ceremonies
Gar-Field graduates between 500 and 700 students every June, and since 2002 all graduations have taken place at EagleBank Arena at nearby George Mason University in order to accommodate the large crowds. The class of 2000 was the first graduating class to have the ceremony at George Mason University.

Robotics Team
Gar-field High School's robotics team started in 2006, and that same year the team won the Virginia FTC Championship and attended the World Championships in Atlanta. The following season G-F placed second in the Virginia Championship, and in the 2008–2009 season the Varsity team, Team 33, "Leviathan", went to Dallas, Texas for the VEX World Championship. They placed within the top 50 out of about 250 teams from all over the world.

During the Robotics season of 2009–2010, the Varsity Team 33, "Maverick", placed 12th in Robot Skills at the 2009-2010 VEX Robotics World Championships in Dallas, TX. They also placed within the top half of their division.

In the 2010–2011 season, the Gar-Field Robotics team was represented in the Prince William County Zero Robotics Team, "SuperNOVA". This team, consisting of students from Osbourn Park, Gar-Field, and Battlefield HS, placed in the Top 5 (Semi-Finalist Standings) and ended up in 3rd place in the nation (Finals). Varsity FTC Team 33, Maverick was a member of the VA FIRST FTC State Championship alliance and attended the 2011 VEX World Championships at the ESPN Wide World of Sports Center in FL.
The team is also responsible for reaching out to the community and to provide mentorship to the surrounding middle schools in need of help and support, such as Beville Middle School and Woodbridge Middle School. The team also actively volunteers by running Qualifiers and the annual Roboticon for the middle school students. G-F Robotics members have also appeared in various functions in the community, such as the Annual Community Covenant in Manassas and National Young Readers' Day.

Awards 

2008-2009 Season:
Excellence Award (VEX)
2009-2010 Season:
Community Award (FTC)
'Spirit Award (VEX)
Tournament Champions (VEX)
2010-2011 Season:
Community Award (VEX)
Finalist Alliance (FTC)
Inspire Award (FTC)
Winning Alliance (FTC)
Think Award (FTC)
Tournament Champions (VEX)
Sportsmanship Award (VEX)
Commendation from the Prince William Board of County Supervisors for Robotics
2019-2020 Season:
Design Award (VEX)
Judges Award (VEX)

Demographics
In the 2019–2020 school year, Gar-Field's 2,305 student body was:
59.8% Hispanic of any race
20.6% Black/African-American
8.3% Asian
7.4% White
3.6% Two or More Races
.1% American Indian/Alaskan
.1% Hawaiian/Pacific Islander

Notable alumni

 Jeff Baker, former MLB player (2005-2015)
 Christian Beranek, comic book writer and film producer
 Benita Fitzgerald, 1984 Olympic gold medalist, 100-meter hurdles
 Paula Girven, Olympic high jumper
 John Goding, choreographer
 Emmylou Harris, country western singer
 Bob Malloy, Texas Rangers/Montreal Expos professional MLB player 1987 and 1990
 Brian McNichol, former MLB player (1999) (Chicago Cubs)
 Jeff Nixon, professional football player
 Winston October, gridiron football player
 Clint Sintim, NFL linebacker, New York Giants
 Chris Sprouse, comic book artist
 Sheena Tosta (née Johnson), Olympic hurdler; won silver in '08
 Susan Walvius, women's college basketball coach
 Tara Wheeler, Miss Virginia 2008 and news anchor for WCAV CBS19 in Charlottesville, VA
 R. Chris White, Academy Award nominee, visual effects supervisor
 Othell Wilson, basketball player
 Andrew York, Grammy-winning recording artist

References

External links
 Official Gar-Field High School website
 Gar-Field IB Program Website
 Prince William County Public Schools

Educational institutions established in 1951
Public high schools in Virginia
Schools in Prince William County, Virginia
International Baccalaureate schools in Virginia
1951 establishments in Virginia
Woodbridge, Virginia